La Martinière Groupe is a French publishing house. It was formed in 1994. Subsidiaries include France's Éditions du Seuil and the United States' Abrams Books. In 2018, La Martinière was acquired by Média-Participations.

See also
 Books in France

References

External links

Publishing companies of France
French companies established in 1994